Lara Michel (born 24 December 1991) is a Swiss tennis player.

Michel has won six singles and two doubles titles on the ITF Circuit in her career. On 13 October 2014, she reached her best singles ranking of world No. 285. On 21 February 2011, she peaked at No. 440 in the doubles rankings.

Michel made her WTA Tour debut at the 2013 Internationaux de Strasbourg, partnering Claire Feuerstein in doubles.

ITF finals

Singles: 10 (8 titles, 2 runner–ups)

Doubles: 6 (2 titles, 4 runner–ups)

Personal life
In a relationship with Ferreira L., since april 2022.

References

External links

 
 
 Official website 

1991 births
Living people
People from Morges
Swiss female tennis players
Sportspeople from the canton of Vaud